North Carolina Highway 742 (NC 742) is a primary state highway in the U.S. state of North Carolina.  It connects the city of Wadesboro with the towns of Oakboro and Chesterfield, South Carolina.

Route description

NC 742 is a predominantly two-lane rural highway that begins at the South Carolina state line, where continuing south on South Carolina Highway 742 (SC 742) would lead to Chesterfield. In Wadesboro, it first runs concurrent with NC 109 before going through the downtown area.  At the intersection of Caswell and Greene Streets, NC 742 switches from NC 109, which continues north to Mount Gilead, onto U.S. Route 52 (US 52) and US 74.  later, NC 742 splits from US 74, which continues west towards Charlotte. After another  and passing over the CSX rail line (originally known as the Seaboard Line), NC 742 splits with US 52, which continues north towards Albemarle.

For the next , NC 742 travels through farmlands of northwestern Anson County, with the community of Burnsville located in the middle of it. After crossing the Rocky River, it enters Stanly County;  later it crosses into Oakboro city limits. As it nears its end in downtown Oakboro, it connects with NC 138 which towards Aquadale and Albemarle. Two blocks further, it ends at the intersection of Main and Second Street, with NC 205, which continues north to Red Cross and southwest to New Salem and Marshville.

History
NC 742 was established in 1936 as a new primary routing from US 74 in Wadesboro to NC 205 in Oakboro.  Around 1947, NC 742 was extended south, over part of US 74 and NC 109, to the South Carolina state line, where it continues south as SC 742 (originally SC 850).  In 1996, the routings of US 52 and NC 742 were adjusted in Wadesboro; they were removed from Salisbury Street and onto a new road further west that crossed over the railroad tracks.

Junction list

References

External links

 
 NCRoads.com: N.C. 742

742
Transportation in Anson County, North Carolina
Transportation in Union County, North Carolina
Transportation in Stanly County, North Carolina